Julius Gant (born January 14, 1982) is a former American football lineman who last played for the San Jose SaberCats of the Arena Football League. Gant attended Maynard H. Jackson High School, where he excelled as an offensive lineman; following his departure from the school, he played football at Middle Tennessee State University. At Middle Tennessee State, Gant served primarily as a right tackle; in 2003, his best season, he started eleven games for the team.

Gant was not selected in the 2005 NFL Draft. He ultimately signed with the San Jose SaberCats of the Arena Football League (AFL); he remained a member of the team for three years. Gant logged minutes as both an offensive lineman and defensive lineman with the team; on the whole, however, he was used mainly in a reserve capacity. On occasion, the SaberCats utilized Gant as a wide receiver; he caught a total of four passes (with three resulting in touchdowns) while with the team.

Gant won his first (and only) AFL Championship when the SaberCats defeated the Columbus Destroyers in ArenaBowl XXI. Following his stint with the SaberCats, he joined the AFL's New Orleans VooDoo; his AFL career ended when the VooDoo released him on April 8, 2011.

References

1982 births
Living people
American football offensive linemen
American football defensive linemen
Middle Tennessee Blue Raiders football players
San Jose SaberCats players
Players of American football from Atlanta